Lochgelly railway station is a railway station in Lochgelly, Scotland.

Lochgelly station is on the end of the town towards Ballingry.

The station can be accessed via a ramp from the small car park up to the Edinburgh platform. To access the north bound platform, passengers must cross the road from the car park and climb a flight of stairs.

This station is unmanned and has no ticket vending facilities. Passengers boarding here must buy their tickets from staff on the train.

There is a public phone in the waiting shelter on the Kirkcaldy platform. There are regular bus services to the town centre.

Services 

There is generally an hourly service in each direction along the Fife Circle Line westbound towards  or eastbound towards .

Daytime services in both directions begin and end at Edinburgh Waverley, apart from a small number of peak trains that start or terminate at Cardenden. Evening trains do not travel beyond  northbound.

On Sundays there is also an hourly service in each direction.

References

External links 

Railway stations in Fife
Former North British Railway stations
Railway stations in Great Britain opened in 1848
Railway stations served by ScotRail
1848 establishments in Scotland
Lochgelly